Andrewi may refer to:

Cape whitefish (Pseudobarbus andrewi), a ray-finned fish species in the family Cyprinidae 
Brachypelma andrewi, a tarantula species of the genus Brachypelma
Myrmarachne andrewi, a jumping spider of the genus Myrmarachne
Sinployea andrewi, a land gastropod of the genus Sinployea
Strymon andrewi, a butterfly of the genus Strymon

See also
Andrew
Andrewsi (disambiguation)